A shooting range, firing range, gun range or shooting ground is a specialized facility, venue, or field designed specifically for firearm usage qualifications, training, practice, or competitions. Some shooting ranges are operated by military or law enforcement agencies, though the majority of ranges are privately owned by civilians and sporting clubs and cater mostly to recreational shooters. Each facility is typically overseen by one or more supervisory personnel, variously called a range master or range safety officer (RSO) in the United States, or a range conducting officer (RCO) in the United Kingdom. Supervisory personnel are responsible for ensuring that all weapon safety rules and relevant government regulations are followed at all times.

Shooting ranges can be indoor or outdoor, and may be restricted to certain types of firearm that can be used such as handguns or long guns, or they can specialize in certain Olympic disciplines such as trap/skeet shooting or 10 m air pistol/rifle.  Most indoor ranges restrict the use of high-power calibers, rifles, or fully automatic weapons.

A shooting gallery is a recreational shooting facility with toy guns (usually very low-power airguns such as BB guns or airsoft guns, occasionally light guns or even water guns), often located within amusement parks, arcades, carnivals or fairgrounds, to provide safe casual games and entertainment for the visiting crowd by prizing customers with various dolls, toys and souvenirs as trophies.

Type
In urban areas, most shooting ranges will be at indoor facilities.  Indoor ranges offer sheltering from inclement weather conditions and can be operated around the clock under a controlled environment.  Outdoor shooting ranges are typically found away from populated areas due to concerns of safety, noise pollution and soil contamination.

Indoor range

Indoor shooting ranges are usually constructed as standalone structures, though they may be housed in larger buildings in isolated areas such as the basement.  The basic components of most indoor ranges consist of firing lines/lanes, targets and a bullet trap/"backstop" (which prevents stray shots and overpenetrations).  Design considerations may vary depending on planned use but they all must address the basic requirements for operating the range safely, and that is provide ballistic protection, safety controls, proper ventilation, acoustic isolation and appropriate lighting.

Structural components 

Firing range walls are usually constructed of poured concrete, precast concrete or masonry blocks. The walls must be sufficiently impenetrable and provide adequate ballistic protection from stray shots and back-splatter.  Floors are constructed from dense reinforced concrete with a smooth surface finish and are usually slanted slightly from up range (shooter positions) toward the backstops downrange to allow for better maintenance and cleaning.

Indoor range roofs are constructed from steel joists or precast concrete panels with a smooth flat surface that will redirect misfired bullets, facilitate maintenance, and prevent lead buildup.  Roof baffles are installed at a 25–30 degree angle to protect ceilings, lighting fixtures, ventilation ducts, and any other unprotected element from stray bullets.  Baffles are typically constructed of armored plate steel covered with fire-rated plywood.  Deflectors are similar to baffles, but are not usually covered with plywood; they can be installed either vertically or horizontally and are used to redirect stray bullets from unprotected fixtures and elements inside the firing range such as doors, windows, and ventilation registers.  Shields are constructed of plate steel and plywood.

The central controls for the firing range equipment, communication, lighting, and security are housed in control rooms or stations.  The range master, who is in charge of range operation and management, operates the controls. The control station must provide the range master with an unobstructed line of sight of the firing lanes and all shooters. Control stations are usually constructed of concrete blocks with bulletproof observation windows.

Backstops and bullet traps are used to absorb the energy from the projectile and capture it to prevent overflight beyond the range area. Bullet traps come in a variety of designs and are usually constructed of impenetrable metal plates.  The thickness of the plates and the materials used depend on the velocity and energy levels of the projectiles to be fired in the range.  The majority of modern bullet traps are made up of angled hardened steel plates that redirect bullets into other metal plates, releasing their energy.  The plates must be resistant to penetration, abrasion, and metal fatigue.  The traps direct the spent bullets to a collection area in front of the trap or, for high-energy projectiles, at the back of the trap.

Many indoor ranges provide additional spaces such as a cleaning room for weapons, a classroom, restrooms (including shower facilities), office areas, lounge area, or storage and maintenance rooms.  Passageways are used to physically isolate the firing range from the adjoining areas.

Physical components 

Some shooting ranges are equipped with shooting booths to provide shooters with a defined private area and to reduce potential hazard from misfires and prevent ejected cartridge cases from hitting/distracting adjacent shooters.  Shooting booths are made of partitions or panels which can be acoustically treated to reduce the unpleasant effects of noise on surrounding bystanders.  The booths are sometimes equipped with communication or target-operation equipment; target or booth lighting controls; shelves for holding weapons and bullets, or to prevent shooters from going downrange; and equipment for practicing shooting from behind a barrier.  The firing line, usually marked red or orange, runs along the downrange edge of the shooting booths.  Some ranges have motion detectors that can set off an alarm when a shooter passes this line during shooting.

Target systems consist of a target object, a target carrier system, and a target control system.  Targets for indoor ranges are usually a paper sheet or piece of corrugated cardboard with a printed image, either a bullseye or a silhouette.  The target carrier system allows the range to operate more efficiently and safely by transporting the target between the firing line and the target line in both downrange and uprange directions, so the shooter does not have to wait for a "ceasefire" and physically walk downrange to examine and set up the target.  The target control system allows the range master to control the operation and movement of the targets through a central control station in the control booth.  Some ranges provide local control modules that can be operated in the shooting booths.

Operational components 

A critical component in the design and proper operation of an indoor ranges is the ventilation system.  Proper ventilation reduces shooters' exposure to airborne lead particles and other combustion byproducts.  Ventilation systems consist of supply and exhaust air systems and associated ductwork.  Supply air can be provided through a perforated wall plenum or radial air diffusers mounted at ceiling height.  Airflow along the firing line should be no more than  0.38 m/s (75 feet per minute, fpm) with a minimum acceptable flow of 0.25 m/s (50 fpm).  Air is typically exhausted at or behind the bullet trap.  Some firing ranges are designed to have multiple exhaust points downrange to maintain downrange flow and desired velocities at the firing line.  The exhaust system should be designed to provide minimum duct air velocities of 12.70 – 15.24 m/s (2,500 – 3,000 fpm).  The equipment and designs for the ventilation systems are varied, most firing ranges have one supply and one exhaust fan, however, some have multiple supply or exhaust fans.  Very often, the air-flow rate required by the firing range and space constraints for the fans dictate the number and types of fans.  Most firing ranges have systems that supply 100% outside air to the firing range and exhaust all of the air to outside the building; but, some firing range ventilation systems are designed to recirculate some of the exhaust air to the supply air system to conserve energy especially in extreme climates.  The exhaust air is always filtered before being exhausted outside the building or recirculated to the supply system.

Lighting in the range consists of control booth, uprange area, shooting booth, and downrange lighting systems.  Control booth lighting is usually manually controlled and consists of general lighting and low-level lighting used during particular shooting conditions.  Lighting uprange of the booths is general ceiling-level lighting and can usually be controlled manually or from the central controls.  Lights downrange of the firing line are usually spotlights used to illuminate the targets at various distances downrange of the booths.

Safety control systems are installed to protect the shooters during range malfunction or emergency situations.  Such systems may include warning lights, alarm bells, and air-flow and filtration monitors.

Outdoor range

Outdoor shooting ranges are used for longer-distance shooting up to or exceeding .  Training might also specifically require exposure to the elements such as wind, dust and rain. Outdoor competition shooting is preferred under benign weather conditions, although conditions may change, competition is only abandoned when safety becomes an issue.

Outdoor ranges are designed to contain all fired shots.  This necessitates a high retaining wall behind the target line called a backstop or stop-butt, comprising an earth mound, sandbag barrier or specially designed funnel-shaped traps to catch and prevent misaligned shots, errant projectile ricochets, or shots going beyond the bounds of the shooting range.  Most outdoor ranges restrict the maximum caliber size and/or projectile energy based on the design specification of the range.  Some target-shooting ranges have separate facilities devoted to the use of higher-powered firearms such as .50 caliber.

Outdoor ranges may be partially enclosed and so have some features in common with indoor ranges, for example the British Armed Forces barrack range has a roofed firing point and normally has 360° walls.  As its name suggests, it is generally found in military bases rather than in the more remote areas common to outdoor ranges.

Several studies of outdoor ranges have shown that prolonged exposure to lead and noise can cause health problems, particularly among employees and instructors.

Due to their larger area and more "open air" nature, outdoor ranges need less cleaning and maintenance than indoor ranges.  However, despite  the  natural ventilation of outdoor firing ranges, some outdoor ranges have ballistic baffles overhead, and concrete walls and structures on the sides that can cause the air to stagnate and lead to increase exposure to lead and noise.

Consequently, operators of outdoor ranges might consider adding sound transmission barriers, absorptive materials, and natural vegetation to lessen noise emission.  Fans pointing downrange can provide air movement away from shooters to lessen lead exposure.

Air rifle

Small-bore rifle
Often called "miniature rifle ranges", they featured as training establishments for initial military marksmanship training using lower-cost ammunition imparting less recoil or for entertainment carnival games or, if built to a high specification, are used for zeroing-in full-bore rifles using specially designed "ladder" targets.

Full-bore rifle
Military ranges are typically at least  to safely accommodate the range of most rifles.

Shotgun
Specialist ranges cater for various clay pigeon shooting events and require special layouts and equipment.

Archery ranges
Oftentimes the same range is made available to both bow and gun shooters. However, there are many ranges that have been made available exclusively for archers, and thousands of them can be found in the USA. The most popular types of archery ranges include 3-D ranges, field ranges and indoor ranges.

Components

Firing point
The firing point normally is at a defined point on the ground, and on a civilian range will usually be level and flat. Outdoor ranges without a covered firing point are usually grass, often on a slightly raised, flattened mound. Outdoor ranges with a covered firing point are usually concrete or tarmacadam. Outdoor military range firing points are not usually covered and may have other configurations, e.g., sloping, a gravel base or hole in the ground.

A "fixed firing point" or echelon rifle range is where the targets are located at the various distances with the marksman or woman shooting from the one firing point. The most advanced rifle range of this design was constructed for the Commonwealth Games New Delhi 2010.

The firing point cover can be as simple as a tent, to a frame with only a roof (to keep off rain or sunshine) to a substantial building with appropriate apertures to shoot through.

Targets 
Civilian targets are usually made of paper or a plastic coreflute, sometimes with a canvas or hessian back on the larger long-range types. Most competitive targets are a solid black circle on a white background. The black circle may have scoring rings. Targets of other shapes may be used such as used in pistol (hand gun) target shooting. Reactive targets allow shooters to easily identify bullet strikes. This allows shooters to improve their skills by quickly being able to compare their aiming point and where the actual bullet impacted the target.

Those who choose to use military surplus rifles in competition on firing ranges at set distances include bolt and semiautomatic actions, with targets used as per military standards, current and historic. The same applies for the matches they shoot. Other target types include a metal plate that is knocked over by the bullet such as in the air rifle sport of field target or handgun discipline of IPSC, and stationary metal plates of scaled animal outlines on which bullet strikes mark as well as those that mark the paint which is painted over again after scoring.

Butts / backstop
The butts / backstop is the area behind the target into which the shot impacts having passed through the target. Outdoor and sometimes indoor ranges have earth or sand butts. Indoor ranges can use angled plates with collectors, often with a rubber curtain through which the bullet passes and is then stopped by a metal plate. Rubber curtains help reduce bullet fragments.

Ranges without automatic target placements sometimes have concrete trenches where personnel lift and retract, mark and replace targets.

They need to be of sufficient height to capture the projectile intended for the target as well as any ricochet that may occur from the projectile striking the floor of the target range fairway. Usually the top is at least five degrees in elevation from the 100m firing line.

Wind flags
Outdoor shooting ranges sometimes have wind flags, positioned between the firing line (where the shooters are) and the targets. Shooters observe these flags to make an estimate of wind speed, which is then converted into lateral minute of angle point of aim corrections or, alternatively, windage holdoff corrections.

The flag method is the most common method used to estimate wind speed. A flag blowing in the wind will naturally blow away from the flagpole, with the angle of the bottom of the flag to the flagpole increasing with increasing windspeed. To estimate the wind speed in mph, the angle in degrees between the bottom of the flag to the flagpole at the mid-range position between the shooter and the target is divided by 4. For example, an angle of 60 degrees between the bottom of a flag and a flagpole would be estimated as a  windspeed.

The clock method is then used to determine full value, half value, or no value corrections in a minute of angle for this wind. Aligning the target at the 12 o'clock position or direction, with the 6 o'clock direction being directly behind the shooter, winds at 3 or 9 o'clock are equated to full value, winds at 1, 2, 4, 5, 7, 8, 10, 11 o'clock are equated to half value, and winds at 12 and 6 o'clock are equated to no value.

The minute of angle correction (full value) is then commonly estimated as ((Range [meters] / 100) × Wind [mph]) / C, where C is a constant. The constant C equals 15 for ranges from 100 to 500 meters, 14 for 600 meters, 13 for 700–800 meters, 12 for 900 meters, and 11 for 1,000 meters.

For full-value winds, this full windage correction is used. For half-value winds, the minute of correction in windage given by this formula is halved; for no-value winds, no minute of angle correction in windage is required.

Multiple flags are required for two reasons. First, the wind speed closest to the midpoint of the range has the greatest effect on the projectile. In addition, the wind at one part of the range will not always be the same at another part.

Wind flags are not always actual flags, sometimes streamers are used, small triangle flags, or even pinwheels. Factors such as the range length and expected strength of the wind determine the best type of flag to use. When no flags are available, a small leaf or another small light object can be dropped from shoulder height, and the object is then pointed at by the shooter; the angle between his arm and his torso can provide an equivalent wind speed estimation as a wind flag, although it will not be at the mid-range location along the bullet's trajectory.

Lighting 
Lighting should be consistent in intensity, glare-free, and shadow-free. The shooter's vision down range should not be obstructed by lighting behind the firing line. The illumination should be bright enough to prevent pupil dilation, which lowers the shooter's visual acuity. Emergency lights for egress, "Range in Use" signs at the entrance, and exit lights are among the other lighting options. During repairs or cleaning, the lighting behind the bullet trap should be at least 30 foot-candles.

Common safety practices

Although some ranges require all weapons to be discharged, securely encased, and/or trigger-locked before entering or exiting the facility, others do not. Many jurisdictions have no such restrictions, regardless of whether one has a concealed carry license in jurisdictions where concealed carry is legal.

Whether indoors or outdoors, all shooters are typically required to wear eye protection as well as hearing protection (ear muffs or earplugs) at all times when within the defined boundaries of the range. Employees and users are exposed to lead dust from bullets or cartridge primers, which can be inhaled or can settle on skin or clothing. Additionally, the discharging of firearms in indoor ranges can produce noise levels of over 140 dB sound pressure level. To combat this, it is commonly recommended that those inside the range  "double-up" ear protection by using both earplugs and over-the-head earmuffs, and to protect range bystanders from sound exposure. Depending on the range, prescription eyeglasses may qualify as eye protection. Indoor ranges can be particularly unsafe, due to high lead exposures and increased noise exposures where the design or management is not of a quality conducive to best practice.

The National Institute for Occupational Safety and Health issued an Alert, that presents five case reports documenting lead and noise exposures, and examines firing range operations, exposure assessment and control methods, existing regulations, and exposure standards and guidelines. More information about reducing occupational exposures at indoor firing ranges can be found at NIOSH Firing Range topic page

In 2013, The National Academy of Sciences published a report titled Potential Health Risks to DOD FIRING-RANGE PERSONNEL from Recurrent Lead Exposure. The report highlighted the shortcomings of current occupational lead exposure standards and urged The Department of Defense to update its guidelines and practices for protecting workers from lead exposure on firing ranges.

Air 
Lead and other pollutants are regulated by ventilation in a range. The configuration of the supply and exhaust air systems is critical for proper operation. Interlocks that enable both the supply and exhaust fans to be working should be designed to ensure proper operation. The range's exhaust system eliminates dirty air.
The air velocity down the range is determined by the exhaust flow rate, but it has no bearing on the airflow pattern at the firing line. A minor negative pressure in the range can be maintained by exhausting 3 to 7% more air than is supplied. The negative pressure of -0.04 + 0.02 inches water gauge should be maintained for ranges. Energy recovery systems should be considered because of the huge amount of air being exhausted. Single-speed fans, not multiple-speed fans, should be used. To demonstrate proper exhaust system function, indicators (static or velocity pressure) for flow monitoring are a good idea. 

Outside air must make up for the lost airflow. The distribution of supply air is crucial in assessing the ventilation system's effectiveness.
Air supply systems are designed to spread air equally over the firing range's distance. Airflow at the shooting line can be unstable if it is not uniformly dispersed, allowing lead and other pollutants to be brought back into the shooter's breathing region. Supply air should be added as high as possible in the range.

Cleaning 
Cleaning floors and horizontal surfaces on a regular basis is recommended. The level of cleaning is determined by how often the range is used. If the floor and horizontal surfaces, such as booth shelves or target retrieval systems, are heavily used, they can require regular cleaning. Cleaning should be done once or twice a week otherwise. Wet methods or a vacuum fitted with a high-performance particulate air (HEPA) filter may be used to clean. The risk of unburned powder accumulating necessitates the use of an explosion-proof HEPA vacuum. The vacuum should be used solely for the removal of lead dust.

Cleaning personnel should be well trained and not attempt to rush the process. Dry sweeping or "blowing down" the range with compressed air should be forbidden. Brooms should not be used to clean spent shell casings ("brass") (a wooden "casino rake" can be useful). During cleanup, the ventilation system should be turned on. Personnel and shooters should be aware of the areas of the range to which they are permitted entry, as well as the areas where their clothing or skin may become contaminated. Shooters should not be permitted to proceed beyond the firing line. Individuals who might need to walk down the range should have disposable shoe coverings accessible. Before consuming food, drinks, or other products, shooters should thoroughly wash their hands and face. Personnel can vacuum off their garments with a HEPA vacuum before leaving the range for operations where contamination is possible. Vacuuming can help to keep lead dust from spreading to other parts of the house, as well as personal vehicles and quarters.

Safety areas 

Safety areas are own places on shooting ranges where a small bay with a safe direction is set up for shooters to be able to handle unloaded firearms without the supervision of a Range Officer (RO). Safety areas are widely used in dynamic shooting sport disciplines  and PPC 1500, and may for example be used to pack, unpack or holster a gun, cleaning or repair, dry firing and training with empty magazines

Specialized classes and licenses
This will vary by country; for example, in some countries, using a shooting range does not require a license or specialized training beyond gun refresher training (for rental guns) and range rules familiarization. In other countries, participants must be part of an organized club and must hold licenses for ownership of individual firearms. A common requirement is that the shooter must be of legal age (or have a guardian present) prior to shooting.

In the United States, training classes for a concealed carry license are often available at shooting ranges.
Many target shooting ranges offer services to aid both novice and expert shooters.

Typically, a range will offer safety courses, concealed carry courses, and advanced training in firearms techniques, for a fee. In addition, some states in the USA require employees who use firearms on the job (e.g., armored car drivers, security guards) to have certain certifications. In most cases, a shooter may take a class and qualify for these certifications at a range.

Many ranges will let shooters rent firearms, as well. In most cases, ranges (especially indoor) rent out handguns and rifles in various calibers, however there are ranges that rent Class III/NFA firearms (full-auto weapons, suppressed weapons, etc.). Some ranges offering firearms rental also provide instructors at little to no cost as part of the rental fee.

Specific countries

Other services
Many target shooting ranges offer services to aid both novice and expert shooters.

Typically, a range will offer safety courses, concealed carry courses, and advanced training in firearms techniques, for a fee. In addition, some states in the USA require employees who use firearms on the job (e.g., armored car drivers, security guards) to have certain certifications. In most cases, a shooter may take a class and qualify for these certifications at a range.

Many ranges will let shooters rent firearms, as well. In most cases, ranges (especially indoor) rent out handguns and rifles in various calibers, however there are ranges that rent Class III/NFA firearms (full-auto weapons, suppressed weapons, etc.). Some ranges offering firearms rental also provide instructors at little to no cost as part of the rental fee.

Specific countries
This article discusses shooting or firing ranges in a general sense. For more specific discussion of shooting ranges in specific countries, see:

Shooting ranges in Norway
Shooting ranges in Switzerland
Shooting ranges in the United States

See also
Gun politics
ISSF shooting events (Olympic events)
Metallic silhouette
Schützenverein
Shooting sports
Sport venue
Tannerite

References

External links
Ranges - NSSF. National Shooting Sports Foundation.
The NRA Range. National Rifle Association.

Gun Club List: a listing directory of Gun Clubs and Shooting Ranges around the world
UK NSRA (National Small-bore Rifle Association)

 
Range
Sports venues by type
Amusement park attractions